Nishikubo Shrine (西久保神社, Nishikubo jinja) was a Shinto shrine in Toyohara, Karafuto Prefecture (today Yuzhno-Sakhalinsk, Sakhalin Oblast, Russia).

The shrine was established in 1915, and its main annual festival was held on July 2. Kami enshrined here included the soul of Major  (西久保豊一郎), a hero of the Russo-Japanese War, and 18 others.

References 

Shinto shrines in Karafuto Prefecture
Religious buildings and structures completed in 1915
20th-century Shinto shrines